Maykopsky District is an administrative and a municipal district (raion), one of the seven in the Republic of Adygea, Russia. It is located in the south of the republic and borders Giaginsky District in the north, Mostovsky District of Krasnodar Krai in the east, the territory of the City of Sochi in Krasnodar Krai in the south, Apsheronsky District of Krasnodar Krai in the west and southwest, and with Belorechensky District of Krasnodar Krai in the northwest. Its administrative center is the rural locality (a settlement) of Tulsky. As of the 2010 Census, the total population of the district was 58,439, with the population of Tulsky accounting for 18.4% of that number.

History
The predecessor of this district was first established on December 28, 1934 as an administrative division of Azov-Black Sea Krai. It was renamed Tulsky on April 10, 1936. When Azov-Black Sea Krai was divided into Krasnodar Krai and Rostov Oblast in September 1937, Tulsky District remained a part of the former. On February 21, 1940, Maykopsky District was established within Adyghe Autonomous Oblast and on April 28, 1962 Tulsky District of Krasnodar Krai was merged into it.

Administrative and municipal status
Within the framework of administrative divisions, Maykopsky District is one of the seven in the Republic of Adygea and has administrative jurisdiction over all of its fifty-seven rural localities. As a municipal division, the district is incorporated as Maykopsky Municipal District. Its fifty-seven rural localities are incorporated into ten rural settlements within the municipal district. The settlement of Tulsky serves as the administrative center of both the administrative and municipal district.

Municipal composition
Abadzekhskoye Rural Settlement
Administrative center: stanitsa of Abadzekhskaya
other localities of the rural settlement:
stanitsa of Novosvobodnaya
settlement of Pervomaysky
stanitsa of Sevastopolskaya
khutor of Vesyoly
Dakhovskoye Rural Settlement
Administrative center: stanitsa of Dakhovskaya
other localities of the rural settlement:
settlement of Guzeripl
selo of Khamyshki
settlement of Merkulayevka
settlement of Nikel
selo of Novoprokhladnoe
settlement of Ust-Sakhray
Kamennomostskoye Rural Settlement
Administrative center: settlement of Kamennomostsky
other localities of the rural settlement:
settlement of Pobeda
khutor of Vesyoly
Kirovskoye Rural Settlement
Administrative center: khutor of Severo-Vostochnyye Sady
other localities of the rural settlement:
khutor of 17 let Oktyabrya
khutor of Dyakov
khutor of Grozny
aul of Mafekhabl
khutor of Oktyabrsky
khutor of Proletarsky
khutor of Sovetsky
Krasnooktyabrskoye Rural Settlement
Administrative center: settlement of Krasnooktyabrsky
other localities of the rural settlement:
stanitsa of Bezvodnaya
stanitsa of Dagestanskaya
settlement of Khakodz
khutor of Krasny Most
stanitsa of Kurdzhipskaya
settlement of Mirny
settlement of Prirechny
khutor of Sadovy
settlement of Spokoyny
settlement of Tabachny
Krasnoulskoye Rural Settlement
Administrative center: khutor of Krasnaya Ulka
other localities of the rural settlement:
khutor of Grazhdansky
khutor of Kalinin
khutor of Komintern
khutor of Tkachyov
khutor of Volny
Kuzhorskoye Rural Settlement
Administrative center: stanitsa of Kuzhorskaya
other localities of the rural settlement:
khutor of Karmir-Astkh
settlement of Tryokhrechny
Pobedenskoye Rural Settlement
Administrative center: settlement of Sovkhozny
other localities of the rural settlement:
khutor of Grozny
settlement of Pobeda
khutor of Prichtovsky
khutor of Shaumyan
settlement of Udobny
Timiryazevskoye Rural Settlement
Administrative center: settlement of Timiryazeva
other localities of the rural settlement:
settlement of Michurina
settlement of Podgorny
settlement of Sadovy
khutor of Shuntuk
settlement of Tsvetochny
Tulskoye Rural Settlement
Administrative center: settlement of Tulsky
other localities of the rural settlement:
selo of Makhoshepolyana

References

Notes

Sources

Districts of Adygea
States and territories established in 1940